John Sinis, or Giannis Sinis (Greek: Γιάννης Σίνης; born September 4, 1991), is a Greek professional basketball player. He is 2.06 m (6'9") tall. He plays at the power forward and center positions.

College career
Sinis played college basketball at the University of San Diego with the Toreros.

Professional career
Sinis began his professional career with the top-tier level Greek Basket League club Rethymno Cretan Kings in 2013. In 2015, he moved to  Kavala. He missed the season, due to injury.

In 2016, he signed with the Psychiko of the 2nd-tier level Greek A2 Basket League.

References

External links
FIBA Game Center Profile
DraftExpress.com Profile
Eurobasket.com Profile
Greek Basket League Profile
ESPN.com College Profile

1991 births
Living people
Centers (basketball)
Greek men's basketball players
Kavala B.C. players
Power forwards (basketball)
Psychiko B.C. players
Rethymno B.C. players
San Diego Toreros men's basketball players
Basketball players from Patras